Orsidis singaporensis is a species of beetle in the family Cerambycidae. It was described by Stephan von Breuning in 1979. It is known from Singapore.

References

Lamiini
Beetles described in 1979